HMS Chippawa, or Chippeway (slang var.), was the mercantile schooner Chippawa, built and launched in 1810. The British brought her into service as HM Schooner Chippawa, sometimes recorded as Chippeway.

The United States later captured her at the Battle of Lake Erie, and brought her into service, as USS Chippewa. A storm drove her aground in October 1813, where a British force burned her in December.

Career
The small merchant schooner Chippawa, built in Chippawa, Ontario, Canada, in 1810, was under the command of her builder Captain Anderson Martin or perhaps his brother Capt. Budd Martin, and trading on the Great Lakes. At the outbreak of the War of 1812 she was ferrying supplies and furs. The British initially armed Chippawa with two guns, and brought her into the Provincial Marine under the command of Lieutenant Rollette. During the one-month armistice in August 1812, Chippawa carried General Isaac Brock on Lake Erie.

She was armed with only one gun and under the command of Master's Mate J. Campbell when on 10 September 1813 the American sloop  captured her during the Battle of Lake Erie. The Americans concentrated their fire on the larger British vessels and Chippawa came under fire when she went to help them. The Americans then captured her and Little Belt while they were trying to escape. Her only casualty was Campbell, who was slightly wounded in the action.

The Americans took her into service as USS Chippewa, under the command of Acting Midshipman Robert S. Tatem. She then carried the baggage of the 27th and 28th regiments of Infantry from Put-in-Bay, Ohio.

Fate

A storm on 12 October drove Chippewa ashore near Buffalo. A later storm on 25–26 October drove Little Belt, Trippe, and  ashore too at Buffalo. All efforts to refloat them failed, and on 30 December the British landing party that captured the Navy yard at Black Rock, New York (now a neighborhood of Buffalo), burned them during the Battle of Buffalo.

Notes

Citations

References
 
 DANFS - Chippewa (I):
 
 Mansfield, John Brandt (1899) History of the Great lakes .... (J. H. Beers & co.) {note; Mansfield errs in several  details about the schooner 'Chippawa'.}
 Mills, James Cooke (1913) Oliver Hazard Perry and the battle of Lake Erie. (J. Phelps).
 
 Slocum, Charles Elihu (1905) History of the Maumee River basin from the earliest account to its organization into counties. (Published by the author).

Schooners of the Royal Navy
War of 1812 ships of the United Kingdom
Ships built in Ontario
1810 ships
Vessels captured by the United States Navy
Schooners of the United States Navy
Great Lakes ships
Provincial Marine
War of 1812 ships of the United States